Lithops bromfieldii, also called the living stone, is a succulent plant from the genus Lithops native to South Africa that looks like stones when not in bloom. It is a tan and reddish brown and can bloom in the fall and in green, white, red or orange.

References

bromfieldii
Flora of South Africa
Taxa named by Louisa Bolus